The 1990 UK Athletics Championships was the national championship in outdoor track and field for the United Kingdom held at Cardiff Athletics Stadium, Cardiff. It was the first time that the event was held in the Welsh capital. Strong winds affected several of the sprint races and jumps on the programme. A women's triple jump was contested for the first time.

It was the fourteenth edition of the competition limited to British athletes only, launched as an alternative to the AAA Championships, which was open to foreign competitors. However, due to the fact that the calibre of national competition remained greater at the AAA event, the UK Championships this year were not considered the principal national championship event by some statisticians, such as the National Union of Track Statisticians (NUTS). Many of the athletes below also competed at the 1990 AAA Championships.

Racewalker Ian McCombie and javelin thrower Steve Backley both won a third straight UK title at the event. Other men to defend titles that year were Colin Jackson (110 m hurdles), Paul Edwards (shot put) and Paul Head (hammer throw). Three women repeated their 1989 victories: Kay Morley (100 m hurdles), Jackie McKernan (discus) and Sharon Gibson (javelin).Myrtle Augee defeated Judy Oakes in the women's shot put to break her rival's winning streak dating back to 1984. No athletes won multiple titles in Cardiff, though champions Sallyanne Short, Phylis Smith, Alison Wyeth and Michelle Griffith all reached the podium in two events.

The main international track and field competition for the United Kingdom that year was the 1990 European Athletics Championships. Britain's men had a highly successful performance there, with Linford Christie, Roger Black, Colin Jackson, Kriss Akabusi, and Steve Backley all going from UK champion to European champion. The 800 m UK champion David Sharpe was also a silver medallist behind his teammate Tom McKean. The four countries of the United Kingdom competed separately at the Commonwealth Games that year as well. UK champions Christie, Akabusi, Backley, Diane Edwards and Myrtle Augee all won gold for England, while Jackson and Morley made it a men's and women's sprint hurdles double for Wales.

Medal summary

Men

Women

References

UK Athletics Championships
UK Outdoor Championships
Athletics Outdoor
Sports competitions in Cardiff
Athletics competitions in Wales